Bristol Marunde (born April 20, 1982) is an American mixed martial artist currently competing in the Welterweight division. He was a contestant on The Ultimate Fighter: Team Carwin vs. Team Nelson, and has competed for the UFC, Strikeforce, Titan FC, M-1 Global, and the Seattle Tiger Sharks of the International Fight League.

In April 2017, Marunde premiered as the cohost of the new HGTV show Flip or Flop Vegas.

Background
Bristol Marunde was born in Fairbanks, Alaska, and moved with his family to Sequim, Washington near Seattle at an early age. In Bellevue, Marunde established notoriety when he applied his MMA techniques to apprehend a wanted rapist lurking in his neighbor's house when she arrived home. Marunde and his father ran the criminal down and apprehended him. The criminal was wanted in 5 states for multiple rapes and burglaries. He was convicted and sent to prison. The Bellevue Chief of Police and the mayor presented Marunde with an outstanding citizen award for his actions.

Marunde was encouraged to try MMA by his older brother Jesse Marunde who placed second in the 2005 World's Strongest Man contest in China. Marunde was devastated by his brother's death in 2007 but has continued fighting.

Mixed martial arts career

Strikeforce
Marunde faced former Strikeforce Middleweight Champion Ronaldo Souza as a late replacement for Derek Brunson at Strikeforce: Tate vs. Rousey. After Souza gained side control Marunde tapped out in the third round due to an arm-triangle choke.

The Ultimate Fighter
Marunde was selected as a contestant on The Ultimate Fighter: Team Carwin vs. Team Nelson. Marunde faced George Lockhart in the preliminary round. Marunde won by guillotine choke submission in the first round. Marunde was later selected by Shane Carwin as his second pick.

On Episode 4, Marunde was selected to fight veteran Julian Lane. After two close grueling rounds, Marunde won the fight via unanimous decision and moved onto the quarter-final round. Marunde eventually lost by decision to Neil Magny in the quarter-final round.

Ultimate Fighting Championship
Marunde made his official UFC debut in April 2013 as he faced season 17 alumni Clint Hester on April 13, 2013 at The Ultimate Fighter 17 Finale. He lost the fight via KO in the third round.

In his second fight for the promotion, Marunde faced promotional newcomer Viscardi Andrade in a Welterweight bout on August 3, 2013 at UFC 163. He lost the fight via TKO in the first round. He was subsequently released from the promotion.

Post-UFC career
Marunde faced Ian Williams for the ROTR Welterweight Championship at Combat MMA Games: Super Brawl 1 on April 6, 2014. He won via submission (kimura) in the first round.
Bristol and his wife Aubrey became the host of HGTV's Flip or Flop Vegas with the first episode airing on April 6, 2017.

Championships and accomplishments
Combat MMA Games
ROTR Welterweight Championship (One time, current)
Superior Cage Combat
SCC Middleweight Championship (One time)

Mixed martial arts record

|-
| Loss
| align=center| 16–10
| Gilbert Smith
| TKO (broken jaw)
| RFA 31: Smith vs. Marunde
| 
| align=center| 4
| align=center| 2:03
| Las Vegas, Nevada, United States
| 
|-
| Win
| align=center| 16–9
| Michael Hill
| Decision (unanimous)
| Xcessive Force FC 6: The Proving Ground
| 
| align=center| 3
| align=center| 5:00
| Grand Prairie, Alberta, Canada
| 
|-
| Win
| align=center| 15–9
| Dave Castillo
| Decision (unanimous)
| Showdown Fights 15: Castillo vs. Marunde
| 
| align=center| 3
| align=center| 5:00
| Orem, Utah, United States
| 
|-
| Win
| align=center| 14–9
| Micah Miller
| Decision (unanimous)
| Titan FC 29: Ricci vs. Sotiropoulos
| 
| align=center| 3
| align=center| 5:00
| Fayetteville, North Carolina, United States
| 
|-
| Win
| align=center| 13–9
| Ian Williams
| Submission (kimura)
| Combat Games MMA: Super Brawl 1
| 
| align=center| 1
| align=center| 1:29
| Snoqualmie, Washington, United States
| 
|-
| Loss
| align=center| 12–9
| Viscardi Andrade
| TKO (punches)
| UFC 163
| 
| align=center| 1
| align=center| 1:36
| Rio de Janeiro, Brazil
| 
|-
| Loss
| align=center| 12–8
| Clint Hester
| TKO (elbow)
| The Ultimate Fighter 17 Finale
| 
| align=center| 3
| align=center| 3:53
| Las Vegas, Nevada, United States
| 
|-
| Loss
| align=center| 12–7
| Ronaldo Souza
| Submission (arm-triangle choke)
| Strikeforce: Tate vs. Rousey
| 
| align=center| 3
| align=center| 2:43
| Columbus, Ohio, United States
| 
|-
| Win
| align=center| 12–6
| Jay Silva
| Decision (unanimous)
| Superior Cage Combat 3
| 
| align=center| 5
| align=center| 5:00
| Las Vegas, Nevada, United States
| 
|-
| Win
| align=center| 11–6
| Victor Moreno
| Submission (kimura)
| Superior Cage Combat 2
| 
| align=center| 1
| align=center| 3:07
| Las Vegas, Nevada, United States
| 
|-
| Win
| align=center| 10–6
| Chuck Grisby
| Decision (unanimous)
| Superior Cage Combat 1
| 
| align=center| 3
| align=center| 5:00
| Las Vegas, Nevada, United States
| 
|-
| Win
| align=center| 9–6
| Shane Primm
| Decision (unanimous)
| M-1 Selection 2010: The Americas Finals
| 
| align=center| 3
| align=center| 5:00
| Atlantic City, New Jersey, United States
| 
|-
| Loss
| align=center| 8–6
| Jordan Smith
| Submission (triangle choke)
| Throwdown Showdown 5: Homecoming
| 
| align=center| 1
| align=center| 2:52
| Orem, Utah, United States
| 
|-
| Win
| align=center| 8–5
| Justin Davis
| Submission (rear-naked choke)
| Rumble on the Ridge 4
| 
| align=center| 1
| align=center| 2:19
| Snoqualmie, Washington, United States
| 
|-
| Win
| align=center| 7–5
| Mychal Clark
| Submission (kimura)
| Alliance: The Uprising
| 
| align=center| 3
| align=center| 4:08
| Kent, Washington, United States
| 
|-
| Win
| align=center| 6–5
| Kyle Keeney
| Decision (unanimous)
| Carnage at the Creek 5
| 
| align=center| 3
| align=center| 5:00
| Shelton, Washington, United States
| 
|-
| Win
| align=center| 5–5
| Will Courchaine
| Submission (kimura)
| CS: Freedom Fights
| 
| align=center| 1
| align=center| 4:51
| Tacoma, Washington, United States
| 
|-
| Win
| align=center| 4–5
| Noah Inhofer
| TKO (corner stoppage)
| Carnage at the Creek 2
| 
| align=center| 2
| align=center| 5:00
| Shelton, Washington, United States
| 
|-
| Loss
| align=center| 3–5
| Benji Radach
| TKO (punches)
| IFL: Everett
| 
| align=center| 1
| align=center| 1:28
| Everett, Washington, United States
| 
|-
| Win
| align=center| 3–4
| John Kading
| KO (punches)
| IFL: Moline
| 
| align=center| 1
| align=center| 1:35
| Moline, Illinois, United States
| 
|-
| Loss
| align=center| 2–4
| Jeremy Williams
| Submission (triangle choke)
| IFL: Oakland
| 
| align=center| 1
| align=center| 1:13
| Oakland, California, United States
| 
|-
| Loss
| align=center| 2–3
| Matt Horwich
| Decision (unanimous)
| IFL: Portland
| 
| align=center| 3
| align=center| 4:00
| Portland, Oregon, United States
| 
|-
| Loss
| align=center| 2–2
| Horace Spencer
| KO (punch)
| Pride and Fury IV: Van Arsdale vs. Oliviera
| 
| align=center| 1
| align=center| 0:33
| Boise, Idaho, United States
| 
|-
| Win
| align=center| 2–1
| Rich Attonito
| TKO (doctor stoppage)
| Euphoria: USA vs. Japan
| 
| align=center| 3
| align=center| 1:57
| Atlantic City, New Jersey, United States
| 
|-
| Loss
| align=center| 1–1
| Art Santore 
| Decision (unanimous)
| SF 10: Mayhem
| 
| align=center| 3
| align=center| 5:00
| Portland, Oregon, United States
| 
|-
| Win
| align=center| 1–0
| Alexei Veselovzorov
| Submission (americana)
| Euphoria: USA vs. Russia
| 
| align=center| 1
| align=center| 2:00
| Atlantic City, New Jersey, United States
|

Mixed martial arts exhibition record

|-
| Loss
| align=center| 2–1
| Neil Magny
| Decision (unanimous)
| The Ultimate Fighter: Team Carwin vs. Team Nelson
| 
| align=center| 2
| align=center| 5:00
| Las Vegas, Nevada, United States
| Quarter-Final round
|-
| Win
| align=center| 2-0
| Julian Lane
| Decision (unanimous)
| The Ultimate Fighter: Team Carwin vs. Team Nelson
| 
| align=center| 2
| align=center| 5:00
| Las Vegas, Nevada, United States
| Preliminary round
|-
| Win
| align=center| 1–0
| George Lockhart
| Submission (guillotine choke)
| The Ultimate Fighter: Team Carwin vs. Team Nelson
| 
| align=center| 1
| align=center| 2:23
| Las Vegas, Nevada, United States
| Elimination round

External links
 
 
 Bristol Marunde's Facebook Page
 Full Article of Recent Fight
Knucklepit

References

1982 births
American male mixed martial artists
Flip or Flop (franchise)
Living people
Middleweight mixed martial artists
Mixed martial artists from Alaska
Mixed martial artists from Washington (state)
Sportspeople from Fairbanks, Alaska
Sportspeople from Seattle
Ultimate Fighting Championship male fighters